Knurów is a city near Katowice in Silesia, southern Poland. Knurów borders on the Upper Silesian Metropolitan Union, a metropolis with a population of two million.

Knurów is located in the Silesian Highlands, on the Bierawka River, a tributary of the Oder River.

History
However, Knurów's existence can be traced back as far back as ca. 1295–1305, when it was mentioned in the Liber fundationis episcopatus Vratislaviensis chronicle, and was part of Piast-ruled Poland. It was then mentioned as Knauersdorf or Cnurowicz, and later on mostly appeared in documents under its current name. Later on, it was also part of Bohemia (Czechia), Prussia and Germany. Throughout centuries, Knurów was a private village, and among its owners were the Goszycki, Węgierski and Paczyński families. The town rapidly grew at the end of the 18th century as the Industrial Revolution came and vast coal reserves were found in the area. In the late 19th century, the settlement had a population of 776. In 1904, the first mine shaft was opened, and in 1908-1909 a railway line connecting Knurów with Rybnik was built. In 1912, the first strike took place at the local mine.

After World War I, in 1918, Poland regained independence, and following the Polish Silesian Uprisings Knurów was reintegrated with Poland. In the interwar period, Knurów developed intensively. New schools, stadiums, a pipeline connecting with Bełk and the first synthetic ammonia plant in Poland were built. In 1923, a monument to the participants of the Silesian Uprisings was unveiled. The coal industry continued growing well in the 20th century, and doubled its output with a new mine being built in 1961 in Szczygłowice.

Knurów and the present-day districts of Krywałd and Szczygłowice were invaded by Germany on September 1, 1939, the first day of the invasion of Poland and World War II. Already in early September 1939, German troops committed a massacre of four Poles in Szczygłowice (see Nazi crimes against the Polish nation). During the subsequent German occupation, the occupiers established and operated two forced labour subcamps (E75, E758) of the Stalag VIII-B/344 prisoner-of-war camp in the town. A unit of the Home Army, the leading Polish resistance organization, was founded in Knurów in 1942. In January 1945, it was captured by the Soviets, who established a transit camp for local Polish Silesians who were deported to the Soviet Union (see Soviet repressions of Polish citizens (1939–1946)). Knurów was restored to Poland, although with a Soviet-installed communist regime, which then stayed in power until the Fall of Communism in the 1980s.

In 1951, Knurów was granted town rights. Several new schools were opened between 1964 and 1991, and new Catholic parishes were established in 1977–1983. More recently, in May 2015, riots ensued in the town after a Concordia Knurów fan was shot dead by police during a football match.

Population
Knurów is one of the cities of the 2.7 million conurbation – Katowice urban area and within a greater Silesian metropolitan area populated by about 5,294,000 people. The population of the town is 38,310 (2019).

Politics

Administratively Knurów has been part of the Silesian Voivodeship since the latter's formation in 1999; previously it was part of Katowice Voivodeship.

Economy

The town is usually associated with coal mining, as it lies in the Upper Silesian Coal Basin.

Sport
The town is home to Concordia Knurów, a lower league football club which was founded in 1923, and famously where Jerzy Dudek started his career. Another famous athlete Agnieszka Dubiel, was a professional sailor for many years. She managed to stay in National Sailing Team and represent Poland on many European and World Championships. Her best result was 21st on Youth World Championship 2014.

The route of the 2016 Tour de Pologne cycling race ran through the town.

Twin towns – sister cities

Knurów is twinned with:
 Kazincbarcika, Hungary
 Svit, Slovakia

References

External links

 Official town website
 Wirtualny Knurów - Non-official town website
 Miasto Knurów - latest local news, entertainment, sport
 Personal blog about Knurów 

 
Cities and towns in Silesian Voivodeship
Gliwice County
Silesian Voivodeship (1920–1939)
Nazi war crimes in Poland
Socialist planned cities